KZSW-LD is a digital low-power television station licensed to Riverside, California. Founded on May 23, 1994, the station is owned by 3ABN.

History
KZSW began as K53DU, a 100-watt low-power television station on channel 53 in Hemet, California. The station was founded by Ray Wilson of Buffalo Communications, and in 1995, it was sold to Victor and LaVerta Page. The station's power was then upgraded to 2.3 kW ERP, along with a call sign change to KHEM-LP. In 2000 the station applied for displacement relief from the FCC and was granted a channel change to channel 27, with a licensed power of 9.99 kW ERP.  The station ran exclusively religious programming until April 2004, when it launched the "Neighborhood Newsroom," a half-hour local news program that focused on the daily happenings in Hemet and San Jacinto.

In 2005 the station moved its studios to Temecula and adopted a traditional commercial programming format with morning and evening local newscasts. In 2006, ownership of the station was transferred to KZSW Television, Inc. The next year, KZSW slashed positions and ditched live newscasts in favor of taped programs. It routinely faced difficulties getting on local cable systems, such as Time Warner Cable.

In 2008, José Aquino, a Mexican-American businessman, signed contracts with the Page family, which owned KZSW-LD television; the Page family rejected Aquino's proposal to convert the station to a Spanish-language format. In February 2009, the station affiliated with NewsNet in a bid to provide local news, weather, and sports coverage pertinent to the Inland Empire and Southern California. In 2009, the Pages sold the operating assets of the station, but not its license, to Michael Sterby, and it is believed that Aquino provided the funds for Sterby to buy the station and used NewsNet to operate it. This set off a series of lawsuits, sparked by the fact that the license was not sold. A source from Milenio newspaper in Mexico reported that Aquino created a new company, also using the KZSW name, with the intent of confusing advertisers. The Pages responded by claiming that their license had been usurped.

On March 22, 2011, Aquino attempted to place NewsNet in bankruptcy, a declaration thrown out six months later.

At some point, the news and local programming stopped, and KZSW began carrying all religious programming from 3ABN.

The station held a construction permit for digital facilities on VHF channel 10, licensed in Riverside, until 2015, when it built those facilities.

References

External links

ZSW
Mass media in Riverside, California
Mass media in San Bernardino, California
Mass media in the Inland Empire
Television channels and stations established in 1994
Temecula, California
ZSW-LD